Henry Rew (11 November 1906 – ) was an English rugby union player.
He won 10 caps for England between 1929 and 1934, and four for the British Lions on their 1930 tour.  He was killed at Nibeiwa Fort while serving with the Royal Tank Regiment.

References

1906 births
1940 deaths
British Army personnel killed in World War II
Royal Tank Regiment officers
English rugby union players
England international rugby union players
British & Irish Lions rugby union players from England